Bottlebrush may refer to:

A type of brush intended for cleaning bottles
 Any of several plants commonly known as bottlebrush
Callistemon, a genus of shrubs and trees from Australia
Beaufortia, a genus of shrubs from Australia
Elymus hystrix, a species of grass from eastern North America
Elymus californicus, a species of grass from California
Bottlebrush (cave formation)

See also 
 Bottlebrush buckeye, a species of shrub from the southeastern United States